Distortodon is an extinct genus of Polyglyphanodontid lizard from the Late Cretaceous of Europe, containing the species D. rhomboideus found in the Csehbánya Formation from the Santonian of Hungary. It is distinguished from other Polyglyphanodontids by having a more distal lingual cusp, creating a distinctive rhomboidal shape in occlusal view.

References 

Prehistoric reptile genera
Santonian life
Late Cretaceous lepidosaurs of Europe
Fossils of Hungary
Fossil taxa described in 2013